Bernard Makuza (born 30 September 1962) is a Rwandan politician who was Prime Minister of Rwanda from 8 March 2000 to 6 October 2011. He also served as President of the Senate of Rwanda from  14 October 2014 to 17 October 2019.

Background
Makuza's father was Anastase Makuza, who served as a minister during Grégoire Kayibanda's presidency. Like his father, Bernard Makuza attended Saint Léon Minor Seminary of Kabgayi.

Career
Makuza was a member of the Republican Democratic Movement (MDR) before the party was dissolved on 14 April 2003 because of its history of promoting genocide ideology. Makuza resigned his membership in the MDR before being appointed Prime Minister. In 2006, during his term as Prime Minister, Makuza identified as belonging to no party.

Prime Minister
Makuza was the Rwandan Ambassador to Burundi and then Ambassador to Germany before being appointed as Prime Minister in March 2000. His appointment to the latter post by President Pasteur Bizimungu followed the resignation of Prime Minister Pierre-Célestin Rwigema, who had been heavily criticized in the Rwandan press and by some parliamentarians.

Makuza remained at the head of a new government named on March 8, 2008, which was composed of 21 ministers and six secretaries of state.

Senate
On 6 October 2011, President Kagame appointed Pierre Habumuremyi to replace Makuza as Prime Minister. Makuza was instead appointed to the Senate. In the Senate, Makuza served as Vice-President for Legislation and Government Oversight. He was subsequently elected as President of the Senate, with 25 out of 26 votes in favor and no opposing candidate, and sworn in on 14 October 2014.

References

1962 births
Living people
People from Butare
Hutu people
Republican Democratic Movement politicians
Prime Ministers of Rwanda
Presidents of the Senate (Rwanda)
Ambassadors of Rwanda to Germany
Ambassadors of Rwanda to Burundi